The Avia Foursomes was a women's foursomes golf tournament contested annually from 1958 to 1989. It was held at Sunningdale Golf Club in its first year but was then played at the Berkshire Golf Club near Ascot, Berkshire. The event consisted of 72 holes of stroke play. From 1958 to 1964 it was called the Kayser Bondor Foursomes and in 1965 Casa Pupo Foursomes before being sponsored by Avia watches from 1966. Avia withdrew their sponsorship after the 1989 event.

In 1978 the event was opened up to professionals, although they had to play with an amateur.

The 1958 event resulted in a tie, with two pairs equal on 317. An event was planned for 1964 but was abandoned because of snow. The 1971 event was reduced to 36 holes after rain caused the final day to be lost. Early morning fog on the final day reduced the 1974 event to 63 holes, with only 9 holes played in the third round. The 1975 event was abandoned due to snow. The first round had not been completed when it as decided to cancel the event. The 1980 event was reduced to 63 holes after snow and rain reduced play on the opening day to 9 holes. The 1985 event was reduced to 36 holes after snow meant that no play was possible on the final day. The 1989 event was reduced to 54 holes by rain.

Winners

References

Amateur golf tournaments
Women's golf tournaments
Golf tournaments in England
Recurring sporting events established in 1958
Recurring sporting events disestablished in 1989
1958 establishments in England
1989 disestablishments in England